Allen Bathurst may refer to:

Allen Bathurst, 1st Earl Bathurst (1684–1775), British politician
Allen Bathurst, 6th Earl Bathurst (1832–1892), British politician
Allen Bathurst, Lord Apsley (1895–1942), British politician